There were three NASCAR national series in 2009:

2009 NASCAR Sprint Cup Series - The top racing series in NASCAR
2009 NASCAR Nationwide Series - The second-highest racing series in NASCAR
2009 NASCAR Camping World Truck Series - The third-highest racing series in NASCAR

 
NASCAR seasons